Hilalia is an extinct genus of "condylarth" that lived during the Eocene. Fossils of Hilalia have been found at Uzunçarsidere Formation in Turkey. It was the last surviving genus of Pleuraspidotheriids, which were previously thought to have gone extinct during the Late Palaeocene.

Taxonomy
Four species have been described, differing from each other primarily by size and premolar morphology.

Species
Hilalia robusta
Hilalia saribeya
Hilalia selanneae
Hilalia sezerorum

Paleoecology
During the Eocene, Turkey is believed to have been an island ecosystem, harboring many taxa that had gone extinct on mainland areas earlier.

Living alongside Hilalia were embrithopods and various metatherians, such as the predatory Anatoliadelphys.

References

Eocene mammals
Eocene mammals of Europe
Prehistoric mammal genera